Jonas Svensson was the defending champion but did not compete that year.

Guy Forget won in the final 6–3, 7–6 against Michiel Schapers.

Seeds
A champion seed is indicated in bold text while text in italics indicates the round in which that seed was eliminated.

Draw

External links
 1989 Lorraine Open Draw

1989 Grand Prix (tennis)